The Congregational Church in Rensselaer Falls, New York is located at 218 Rensselaer St.

It was listed on the National Register of Historic Places in 2005 for the architectural merit of the church.

It was built in the Greek revival style.

References

Churches on the National Register of Historic Places in New York (state)
United Church of Christ churches in New York (state)
National Register of Historic Places in St. Lawrence County, New York